The National Leftist Revolutionary Union was a radical political party that operated in Colombia in the early 1930s.

History 

The movement was founded in 1933 by populist leader Jorge Eliécer Gaitán after he broke with the Liberal Party.  
In 1935, Gaitan decided to rejoin the Liberals, and disbanded the National Leftist Revolutionary Union in the same year.

References 

Left-wing parties in Colombia
Liberal parties in Colombia
Radical parties